Croatia has severe problems with corruption, and among European Union member states, it is one of the top 5 most corrupt countries. 

In order to qualify as a member of the European Union, Croatia has taken some measures to combat corruption. The legal and institutional framework as well as government agencies are addressing the issue of corruption in a much larger scale, and the inter-agency cooperation for corruption prevention has also increased, but these efforts are facing the large obstacle of an inefficient and corrupt judicial system. USKOK has  prosecuted 2,000 individuals and achieved a 95% conviction rate (2012) (although convictions rarely resulted with prison sentences), including former Prime Minister Ivo Sanader.

Several civil servants in the Croatian Privatization Fund, the Zagreb land registry and the Zagreb taxation headquarters, among others, were arrested on charges of bribery. Moreover, several high-profile corruption cases have come to light, including investigations of a former defense minister and a former deputy prime minister.

A 2013 Global Corruption Barometer report by Transparency International showed that 41% of respondents believe that the level of corruption increased in Croatia.

Transparency International's 2022 Corruption Perceptions Index scored the country at 50 on a scale from 0 ("highly corrupt") to 100 ("very clean"). When ranked by score, Croatia ranked 57th among the 180 countries in the Index, where the country ranked first is perceived to have the most honest public sector.  For comparison, the best score was 90 (ranked 1), and the worst score was 12 (ranked 180).

See also
 Privatization in Croatia
 Business Anti-Corruption Portal
 Ankica Lepej - first prominent whistleblower case

References

Further reading

Croatia
Crime in Croatia by type
Politics of Croatia
Corruption in Croatia